Achilleas Farsala F.C., also known simply as Achilleas, A.O.F. or with its full name as A.O.F. Achilleus 1928, is a Greek football club, based in Farsala, a historical city near Larissa. The colour of the team's shirts is yellow and black.

History
Achilleas was founded on 1928 and is one of the most historical clubs in Greece and one of the most historical teams in Larissa. The team participates for several years in Larissa FCA championships, but it also took part at the past at Football League and Gamma Ethniki. Achilleas Farsala is proud to be the team with the most Larissa FCA cups, 7 in total. Some important players of Greek football have played at the team, like Nikolaos Kehagias, George Moustakas, Christos Dailianis at the past, Nikos Voulgaris, Apostolos Tsianakas, Vasilis Tsianakas, Christos Oikonomou, Kostas Nebegleras at the recent years. Also, the team had in its staff many famous coaches, like Horacio Morales.

Stadium
The Farsala Municipal Stadium has a capacity of about 2,500 people and is considered to be one of the largest courts in the prefecture after AEL FC Arena and Alcazar Stadium.

Supporters
The fans of the team, are called Myrmidons (Greek: Μυρμιδόνες), like the ancient Greek brave warriors from Farsala, trained by Achilles, support the team with passion and follow the team at home and away matches.

Honors

Domestic Titles and honors
 Gamma Ethniki champions: 1
 1972-73
 Delta Ethniki champions: 2
 1984-85, 1987–88
 Larissa FCA Champions: 10
 1969-70, 1970–71, 1972–73, 1975–76, 1977–78, 1978–79, 1980–81, 1995–96, 2002–03, 2016–17
 Larissa FCA Cup Winners: 7
 1977-78, 1978–79, 1981–82, 1982–83, 1990–91, 2003–04, 2016–17

References

Football clubs in Thessaly
Larissa (regional unit)
Association football clubs established in 1928
1928 establishments in Greece
Gamma Ethniki clubs